Benjamin F. Kramer (born March 5, 1957) is an American politician from Maryland and a member of the Democratic Party. He is currently serving in his second term in the Maryland House of Delegates, representing Maryland's District 19 in Montgomery County. He currently serves on the Judiciary Committee. Kramer is the son of former State Senator and former Montgomery County Executive Sidney Kramer, and brother of former State Senator Rona E. Kramer.

Career
 Awarded the MADD Visionary Award for his service and efforts to pass the Drunk Driving Elimination Act during the 2010 Maryland legislative session.

Legislative Notes
 Voted in favor of in-state tuition for Maryland nonresidents who can demonstrate payment of Maryland withholding tax in 2007 (HB6)
 Was a sponsor of, and strongly pursued enactment of, 2010 HB 756, the "Maryland Gang Prosecution Act of 2010."

Task Force, Boards and Commissions
2012-  Kramer was appointed by Maryland legislative leaders to a task force to study the impact of a Maryland Court of Appeals ruling regarding the liability of owners of pit bulls and landlords that rent to them.

Nazi Reference and Rebuke by Archbishop Desmond Tutu

In the 2014 Maryland legislative session, Delegate Kramer introduced legislation to prevent the use of public college and university funds to support scholarly involvement in academic organizations that have voted to boycott Israel. Baltimore Sun

The legislation failed to get out of committee so Delegate Kramer added language as an amendment to the State's budget bill. On April 2, 2014, Archbishop Desmond Tutu of South Africa issued a statement expressing "grave concern" over the effort and also over Delegate Kramer's remarks comparing the boycott movement against Israel to the actions of the Nazis in Germany.Tutu Statement

References

Democratic Party members of the Maryland House of Delegates
Living people
1957 births
People from Wheaton, Maryland
21st-century American politicians
Democratic Party Maryland state senators